Nunzio (Toots) Mondello (August 14, 1911 in Boston, Massachusetts – November 15, 1992 in New York City, New York) was an American swing jazz alto saxophonist.

Mondello played with Mal Hallett from 1927 to 1933, where he also simultaneously performed saxophone and trombone, and with Irving Aaronson's Commanders, Joe Haymes, and Buddy Rogers. In 1934–35 he was a member of the Benny Goodman Orchestra; he returned to play with Goodman in 1939–40. In the interim he worked with Haymes, Ray Noble, and Phil Harris.

He did extensive work as a studio sideman, with Chick Bullock, Bunny Berigan, Miff Mole, Claude Thornhill, Larry Clinton, Teddy Wilson, Louis Armstrong (1938–39), Lionel Hampton, and the Metronome All–Stars. He recorded as a leader between 1937 and 1939, doing two sessions with a big band, one with a nonet, and one with a trio.

Mondello served in the military during World War II. He continued doing session work and remained active into the 1970s. He and Goodman reunited to record in 1967.

He was also a flutist. For many years he studied with Harold Bennett and compiled a book of Bennett's finger exercises. He studied composition with Paul Creston for thirteen years, and the two remained lifelong friends.

References

Scott Yanow, [ Toots Mondello] at Allmusic
 .

 .

1911 births
1992 deaths
American jazz saxophonists
American male saxophonists
20th-century American saxophonists
20th-century American male musicians
American male jazz musicians